Pag lace is a type of lacework from Pag on the island of Pag, it requires a needle, thread and backing which is a round or square hard stuffed pillow.

Lace-makers of Pag did their teg (work) without any drawings. Each woman used works from her mother and grandmothers as examples, each adding a personal touch, something unique and special. Each lace piece is a symbol of the anonymous, modest and self-sacrificing life of its maker.

In 2009, Lacemaking in Croatia, represented by Lepoglava lace, Pag lace and Hvar lace, was inscribed in the UNESCO's Representative List of the Intangible Cultural Heritage of Humanity.

History
The peculiarity of Pag lace is that it is believed to have its roots in Mycenae and has remained in the city of Pag since ancient times because the first records of Pag lace date from the 15th century when the monastery of the Benedictine nuns is mentioned. Before, there were no stencils or blueprints for making, but the way they were made and their pattern was passed from generation to generation, from mother to daughter by word of mouth and practical work. Benedictine Monastery of St. Margaritas is also responsible for spreading Pag lace, which they sold to Venice or Vienna. The Benedictine sisters were the main initiators of lacemaking and the lace school in Pag. Today, the monastery has a collection of over a hundred exhibits that has been preserved and collected for over 150 years.

For the first time that Pag lace was officially presented at the exhibition in 1880. In the period from 1906 to 1943, Pag lace was shown at numerous exhibitions around the world, in London, New York, Budapest, Belgrade, Vienna, Milan, Prague. At the World's Fair in Paris in 1937, it received a gold plaque as an extremely valuable handiwork. Empress Maria Theresa kept a Pag lacemaker at the Viennese court, who sewed lace for the needs of the court.

See also 
 Lacemaking in Croatia

References

External links

 PAG LACE THE LACE OF EMPERORS

Needle lace
Textile arts of Croatia
Pag (island)